"Summer Bummer" is a song by Lana Del Ray, ASAP Rocky, and Playboi Carti.

Summer Bummer may also refer to:

 "Summer Bummer", an episode of The Fairly OddParents
 "Summer Bummer", an episode of Sister, Sister
 "Summer Bummer", an episode of The Powerpuff Girls
 "The Summer Bummer", an episode of The O.C.
 "Summer Bummer", a song by Benjamin Redman of Residual Kid
 Summer Bummer, an animated short by Bill Plympton
 June Gloom, also called "Summer Bummer"